The T.S. Eliot Appreciation Society is an indie folk band from the Netherlands, founded by singer-songwriter Tom Gerritsen in 2011.

Overview 
After busking for several years on the streets of major cities in Canada and the United States, Tom Gerritsen returned to Utrecht, Netherlands to record a lo-fi EP. After the release, The T.S. Eliot Appreciation Society played a string of well-received shows throughout the Netherlands, alternating between smaller and larger venues, such as the Effenaar and Tivoli and sharing the stage with the likes of I Am Oak, Absynthe Minded, Simon Joyner and Rivulets. In 2013, a debut album entitled A New History was recorded in New Ground Studio in Utrecht, with the assistance of members from the post-rock band We vs. Death. The record was released in the fall of 2013.

Discography

Studio albums

EPs

References

External links 
 Website of The T.S. Eliot Appreciation Society
 The T.S. Eliot Appreciation Society on Bandcamp
 The T.S. Eliot Appreciation Society on Soundcloud

Musical groups established in 2012
Dutch musical groups
2012 establishments in the Netherlands